This is a list of public airports in the People's Republic of China grouped by provincial level division and sorted by main city served.  It includes airports that are being built or scheduled for construction, but excludes defunct airports and military air bases.

There were 229 civil airports at the end of 2017, with a few dozen more under construction. This figure includes airports governed by the Civil Aviation Administration of China (CAAC) and it does not include the special administrative regions of Hong Kong and Macau (or the area administered by Taiwan). Both Hong Kong and Macau have their own civil aviation regulators (the Civil Aviation Department and the Civil Aviation Authority respectively).

Airports

See also
 List of the busiest airports in China
 List of People's Liberation Army Air Force airbases
 List of busiest airports by passenger traffic
 List of airports by ICAO code: Z

Notes

References

 
 
  - includes IATA codes
 Great Circle Mapper: Airports in China - IATA and ICAO codes
 World Aero Data: China - ICAO codes

External links
 Asia Times: Airlines & Airports in China
 Chinese airport list and search page on feeyo.com 
 English airport list and flight schedules of the airports 

China
 
 
China